The following is a list of notable deaths in July 2010.

Entries for each day are listed alphabetically by surname. A typical entry lists information in the following sequence:
 Name, age, country of citizenship at birth, subsequent country of citizenship (if applicable), reason for notability, cause of death (if known), and reference.

July 2010

1
Kwasi Annoh Ankama, 53, Ghanaian lawyer and politician.
Azad, 57–58, Indian politician, shot.
Black Tie Affair, 24, American Thoroughbred racehorse, euthanized.
Alison Booker, 47, British radio broadcaster (BBC Oxford), breast cancer.
Francisco Claver, 84, Filipino Jesuit priest, first Igorot bishop, Bishop of Malaybalay (1969–1984).
Gareth Clayton, 68, Australian politician, member of the House of Representatives (1974–1975).
Don Coryell, 85, American football coach (San Diego Chargers, St. Louis Cardinals).
Arnold Friberg, 96, American painter, complications from a fall.
Geoffrey Hutchings, 71, English actor (Poppy, Henry V, Topsy-Turvy), viral infection.
Lele, 24, Puerto Rican rapper, shot.
Aurelio Macchi, 94, Argentine sculptor.
Eleanor Morse, 97, American art collector, co-founder of the Salvador Dali Museum, after long illness.
Eddie Moussa, 26, Swedish footballer (Assyriska Föreningen), shot.
Ong Yoke Lin, 92, Malaysian politician, minister and ambassador, founder of the Malaysian Chinese Association.
John Rinne, 86, Finnish Orthodox prelate, archbishop of Karelia and All Finland (1987–2001).
Singspiel, 18, Irish Thoroughbred racehorse, euthanized.
Borivoj Vukov, 80, Serbian Olympic wrestler.
Ilene Woods, 81, American singer and actress (Cinderella), complications from Alzheimer's disease.
Betty Lou Young, 91, American writer and conservationist, after short illness.

2
Wilfredo Alarcón, 77, Chilean Catholic priest.
Dame Beryl Bainbridge, 77, English novelist (Harriet Said..., An Awfully Big Adventure), cancer.
Mahfoud Ali Beiba, 57, Sahrawi politician and negotiator, President of Sahrawi National Council (2003–2010), heart attack.
Frank Colacurcio, 93, American organized crime figure.
Stephen Kanner, 54, American architect, co-founder of the A+D Museum, cancer.
Simon Kornblit, 76, Belgian-born American studio executive, Executive Vice President of worldwide marketing (Universal Pictures), myeloid leukemia.
Fred Maryanski, 63, American educator, President of Nevada State College (2005–2010).
Carl Adam Petri, 83, German computer scientist.
Félix Pons, 68, Spanish politician, President of the Congress of Deputies (1986–1996), cancer.
M. G. Radhakrishnan, 70, Indian music director, liver disease.
Leonard Searle, 79, American astronomer.
Steve Stanlee, 90, American professional wrestler.
Tommy Tabermann, 62, Finnish poet and politician, Member of Parliament (2007–2010), brain tumour.
Laurent Terzieff, 75, French actor, lung complications.
Ann Waldron, 85, American writer and biographer, heart failure.

3
Carlo Aymonino, 83, Italian architect.
Murray Chercover, 80, Canadian broadcaster and CEO (CTV Television), complications from pneumonia.
Abu Daoud, 73, Palestinian politician and military commander, planned 1972 Summer Olympics Munich massacre, kidney failure.
William Dougherty, 78, American politician, Lieutenant Governor of South Dakota (1971–1975), cancer.
Herbert Erhardt, 79, German footballer, 1954 FIFA World Cup winner.
Colin Gardner, 69, British football manager, brain cancer.
Israel Hicks, 66, American stage director (Pittsburgh Cycle), prostate cancer.
Cle Jeltes, 86, Dutch sailor.
Carlos Arturo Juárez, 94, Argentine politician, Governor of Santiago del Estero Province, cardiac arrest.
Ed Limato, 73, American talent agent, after long illness.
Oguri Cap, 25, Japanese Thoroughbred racehorse, euthanized.
Clara Claiborne Park, 86, American author, complications from a fall.
Roberto Piva, 72, Brazilian poet and writer, complications from Parkinson's disease.
Johnny Sellers, 72, American jockey.
Michael Keith Smith, 56/7, British politician.
Sir Frederick Warner, 100, British chemical engineer.

4
Bal Bahadur Rai, 89, Nepali politician.
Robert N. Butler, 83, American physician, Pulitzer Prize winner (Why Survive? Being Old in America), founder of NIA, leukemia.
Mohammad Hussein Fadlallah, 74, Lebanese militant, spiritual leader to Hezbollah.
Glenn Falkenstein, 78, American magician, complications of Alzheimer's disease.
James Forrest, 88, South African cricketer.
John Hampton, 103, American philanthropist, co-founder of Toys for Tots.
Alf Howard, 104, Australian explorer.
*Hwang Yau-tai, 98, Taiwanese musician and composer, multiple organ failure.
Oscar Kruger, 77, Canadian football player (Edmonton Eskimos), after long illness.
John Morkel, 81, Rhodesian international rugby union player, complications from hip surgery.

5
*Nasr Abu Zayd, 66, Egyptian Qur'anic theologian, brain infection.
Jim Bohlen, 84, American-born Canadian environmentalist, founder of Greenpeace.
William R. Callahan, 78, American Jesuit priest, challenged policies of the Vatican, Parkinson's disease.
Brazeal Dennard, 81, American conductor.
David Fanshawe, 68, British composer (African Sanctus), explorer and ethnomusicologist, stroke.
Jia Hongsheng, 43, Chinese actor, suicide by jumping.
Andriy Horak, 64, Ukrainian Orthodox prelate, Metropolitan of Lviv and Sokal in Ukrainian Orthodox Church of the Kyivan Patriarchate (since 1993), after long illness.
Juanita M. Kreps, 89, American economist, Secretary of Commerce (1977–1979), Alzheimer's disease.
Pete Morgan, 71, British poet.
Bob Probert, 45, Canadian ice hockey player (Detroit Red Wings, Chicago Blackhawks), suspected heart attack.
Victor Rodrigues, 66, Indian Konkani litterateur and novelist.
Cesare Siepi, 87, Italian opera singer, respiratory failure.
Tony Younger, 91, British general.

6
Tilly Armstrong, 83, British writer.
Jan Blokker, 83, Dutch journalist.
Harvey Fuqua, 80, American rhythm and blues singer (The Moonglows), and record producer (Marvin Gaye), heart attack.
Kristofer Leirdal, 94, Norwegian sculptor.
Stanislaus Tobias Magombo, 42, Malawian Roman Catholic prelate, Auxiliary Bishop of Lilongwe (2009–2010).
A. T. Mahmud, 80, Indonesian composer and television host, pneumonia.
Igor Misko, 23, Russian ice hockey player (SKA Saint Petersburg), cardiac arrest.
John North, 89, American football player (Baltimore Colts) and coach (New Orleans Saints), after long illness.
José Rico Pérez, 92, Spanish businessman, president of Hércules CF.
Glenn Simpson Pound, 96, American educator.
Ramón Eduardo Ruiz, 88, American historian of Mexico and Latin America.
Alekos Sofianidis, 77, Turkish-born Greek footballer, manager of the Greece national football team (1988–1989).
Rebecca Spikings-Goldsman, 42, American film producer, heart attack.
Simion Stanciu, 60, Romanian pan flautist, after long illness.
Roberto Suárez, 82, Cuban-born American newspaper publisher (El Nuevo Herald), complications from Alzheimer's disease.
Roy Waller, 69, British radio presenter, liver disease.

7
Asher Arian, 71, American and Israeli political scientist.
Emilio Q. Daddario, 91, American politician, U.S. Representative for Connecticut (1959–1971), heart failure.
Frank Dochnal, 89, American racecar driver.
Bob Harvie, Sri Lankan cricket commentator.
John Henning, 73, American newscaster (WNAC, WCVB, WBZ), complications from leukemia.
Robbie Jansen, 60, South African jazz musician, after long illness.
Moko, 4, New Zealand dolphin, beached.
Brian O'Shaughnessy, 84, Australian philosopher.
Sándor Páll, 56, Serbian politician, leader of Democratic Fellowship of Vojvodina Hungarians.
Bill Porter, 79, American sound engineer.
Luz Sapag, 66, Argentine politician, mayor of San Martín de los Andes (2007–2010), car crash.
Frederick John Thompson, 75, Canadian politician, member of the Legislative Assembly of Saskatchewan.

8
Goro Azumaya, 90, Japanese mathematician.
David Blackwell, 91, American academic, stroke.
David Blewitt, 81, American film editor (Ghostbusters, The Competition), Parkinson's disease.
Anders Bratholm, 90, Norwegian jurist.
Robert Freitag, 94, Austrian-born Swiss actor.
Clint Hartung, 87, American baseball player (New York Giants).
Donald Hawgood, 93, Canadian Olympic silver medal-winning (1952) canoeist.
Bidzina Kvernadze, 82, Georgian composer, Parkinson's disease.
Guillermo León, 82, Costa Rican footballer (Deportivo Saprissa).
Lelio Luttazzi, 87, Italian composer, actor, television and radio presenter.
Maje McDonnell, 89, American baseball coach and official (Philadelphia Phillies).
Achdiat Karta Mihardja, 99, Indonesian novelist and playwright, stroke.
John Moore, 88, British naval officer and editor.
Thomas C. Peebles, 89, American physician, isolated the measles virus.
Willi Railo, 69, Norwegian sports psychologist.
Patrick Rice, 64, Irish human rights activist.
Melvin Turpin, 49, American basketball player, suicide by gunshot.
Peter Walker, 68, Australian football player, cancer.

9
Yehuda Amital, 85, Israeli rabbi and politician.
Jessica Anderson, 93, Australian writer (Tirra Lirra by the River).
Olle Barkander, 92, Swedish Olympic equestrian.
Kenneth Beard, 83, British cathedral organist.
Mark Bytheway, 46, British Quizzing world champion, esophageal cancer.
Eleanor Coen, 93, American artist.
Basil Davidson, 95, British journalist and historian.
Sir Marrack Goulding, 73, British diplomat.
Clément Guillon, 78, French Roman Catholic prelate, Bishop of Quimper and Leon.
Daryl Hunt, 53, American football player (Houston Oilers), heart attack.
Vonetta McGee, 65, American actress (Blacula, The Eiger Sanction), cardiac arrest.
Milt Morin, 67, American football player (Cleveland Browns), heart attack.
Nobuyoshi Tamura, 77, Japanese aikidoka, cancer.
Frank Verdi, 84, American baseball player (New York Yankees).

10
Eric Batchelor, 89, New Zealand soldier, twice awarded Distinguished Conduct Medal for bravery.
Ray Beachey, 94, Canadian historian.
John Coates, 88, British naval architect.
David Gay, 90, English Army officer, cricketer and educator, awarded Military Cross for bravery.
Seán Dublin Bay Rockall Loftus, 82, Irish politician and lawyer, TD for Dublin North-East (1981–1982).
Sugar Minott, 54, Jamaican reggae singer.
Ed Palmquist, 77, American baseball player.
Aldo Sambrell, 79, Spanish actor, stroke.
Kōhei Tsuka, 62, Japanese playwright, lung cancer.
George W. Webber, 90, American minister, President of New York Theological Seminary, complications of Alzheimer's disease.

11
Sheila Amos, 63, American film editor (The Thing About My Folks), leukaemia.
Idham Chalid, 88, Indonesian politician, speaker of MPR/DPR in Indonesia (1971–1977), stroke.
Stuart F. Feldman, 73, American lawyer and lobbyist, co-founded the Vietnam Veterans of America, pneumonia.
Walter Hawkins, 61, American gospel music singer ("Oh Happy Day"), pancreatic cancer.
Daja Wangchuk Meston, 39, Tibetan-born American Buddhist monk.
Marco Aurelio Martínez Tijerina, 45, Mexican journalist, shot. 
Bob Sheppard, 99, American public address announcer (New York Yankees, New York Giants).
Rudi Strittich, 88, Austrian football player and coach.
Don Vélez, 62, Nicaraguan Olympic athlete.
Arthur Williams, 63, American criminal, head injury from car crash.

12
Mary Adams, 87, Scottish interceptor, Alzheimer's disease.
Günter Behnisch, 88, German architect.
William Derwood Cann, Jr., 90, American army officer and businessman.
Buff Cobb, 82, American actress and talk show host.
Olga Guillot, 87, Cuban singer, infarction.
James P. Hogan, 69, British science fiction author.
Henryk Jankowski, 73, Polish Roman Catholic priest.
Tuli Kupferberg, 86, American poet, cartoonist and musician (The Fugs).
Paul Locatelli, 71, American Jesuit priest and accountant, Chancellor (2008–2010) and President (1988–2008) of Santa Clara University, pancreatic cancer.
Thomas P. Morahan, 78, American politician, member of the New York State Assembly (1981–1982); State Senator (1999–2010), leukemia.
Paulo Moura, 77, Brazilian saxophonist and clarinetist, lymphoma.
Pius Njawé, 53, Cameroonian journalist and activist, car accident.
Harvey Pekar, 70, American comic book writer (American Splendor) and music critic, accidental medication overdose.
Mau Piailug, 78, Micronesian navigator.
Bernardino Rivera Álvarez, 85, Bolivian Roman Catholic prelate, Auxiliary Bishop of Potosí.

13
Vernon Baker, 90, American soldier, Medal of Honor recipient, cancer.
Ken Barnes, 81, British footballer, lung cancer.
Amanda Berenguer, 89, Uruguayan poet.
Gilly Coman, 50, British actress (Bread), suspected heart attack.
Dave Cox, 72, American politician, member of the California State Assembly (1998–2004), state senator (2004–2010), prostate cancer.
Nino Defilippis, 78, Italian cyclist.
Gene Goodreault, 91, American football player (Boston College), after long illness.
Alan Hume, 85, English cinematographer (Return of the Jedi, A Fish Called Wanda, A View to a Kill).
Pentti Linnosvuo, 77, Finnish sport shooter, 1956 and 1964 Olympic champion.
Lloyd Morain, 93, American businessman, philanthropist, writer and humanist.
Abdel Kader Rabieh, 52, Egyptian Olympic basketball player.
André Kagwa Rwisereka, 60, Rwandan politician, murder.
Manohari Singh, 79, Indian saxophonist, heart attack.
George Steinbrenner, 80, American baseball team owner (New York Yankees), heart attack.

14
Charles Beirne, 71, American Jesuit priest, president of Le Moyne College (2000–2007), cancer.
Mike Kerruish, 61, Manx politician and chief judge.
Seymour London, 95, American doctor, invented automatic sphygmomanometer, heart disease.
Gene Ludwig, 72, American jazz organist.
Sir Charles Mackerras, 84, American-born Australian conductor, cancer.
Mădălina Manole, 43, Romanian pop singer, suicide.
Tetsuo Mizutori, 71, Japanese voice actor.
Bernhard Nermerich, 71, German Olympic athlete.
Derek Nicholls, 63, English cricketer, stroke.
Joseph Rodericks, 83, Indian Roman Catholic prelate, Bishop of Jamshedpur (1970–1996).
Eduardo Sánchez Junco, 67, Spanish businessman, founder and owner of Hello!.
SJ Stovall, 84, American politician, mayor of Arlington, Texas (1977–1983).

15
Bulbul Ahmed, 68, Bangladeshi actor.
James E. Akins, 83, American diplomat, Ambassador to Saudi Arabia (1973–1976), heart attack.
Wye Jamison Allanbrook, 67, American musicologist, cancer.
Nicolas Carone, 93, American painter.
Hank Cochran, 74, American country music singer-songwriter, pancreatic cancer.
Peter Fernandez, 83, American voice actor (Speed Racer), lung cancer.
Tom Gage, 67, American Olympic hammer thrower, heart failure.
Kip King, 72, American actor, voice actor and comedian, after long illness.
Sally Laird, 54, British editor (Index on Censorship) and translator.
Billy Loes, 80, American baseball player (Brooklyn Dodgers), complications from diabetes.
*Luo Pinchao, 98, Chinese opera singer.
Billy McKinney, 83, American politician, member of Georgia House of Representatives (1973–2003), cancer.
Saša Marković Mikrob, 50, Serbian artist and journalist.
Robin Roe, 81, Irish rugby union player, British Army chaplain.
Knut Stensholm, 56, Norwegian drummer (Sambandet).

16
Verily Anderson, 95, British novelist, memoirist and biographer.
Aleksandr Boloshev, 63, Russian Soviet basketball player, 1972 Olympic gold medalist, stroke.
James Gammon, 70, American actor (Major League, Nash Bridges, Cold Mountain), liver cancer.
Kenny Kuhn, 73, American baseball player (Cleveland Indians), pancreatic cancer.
Carlos Torres Vila, 63, Argentine folk singer, after long illness.
David Twersky, 60, American journalist, cancer.

17
Nick Bacon, 64, American soldier, Medal of Honor recipient, cancer.
John R. Branca, 86, American Chairman of the New York State Athletic Commission, vascular disease.
Fred Carter, Jr., 76, American musician, stroke.
Bernard Giraudeau, 63, French actor, cancer.
Sir Simon Hornby, 75, British businessman.
Denise Jefferson, 65, American dancer, director of the Ailey School, ovarian cancer.
Larry Keith, 79, American actor (All My Children), cancer.
Shaun Mawer, 50, English footballer (Grimsby Town F.C.), kidney failure.
Pres Romanillos, 47, Filipino-born American animator (Mulan, Spirit: Stallion of the Cimarron, Pocahontas).
Shirley Silvey, 82, American animator (The Rocky and Bullwinkle Show, Dudley Do-Right, George of the Jungle), heart failure.
Ioannis Stefas, 61, Greek footballer (PAOK F.C.), cancer.
Joyce Sumbi, 74, American librarian.
Evaristus Thatho Bitsoane, 71, Mosotho Roman Catholic prelate, Bishop of Qacha's Nek (1981–2010).
Gunārs Ulmanis, 71, Latvian footballer (FK Daugava Rīga), natural causes.

18
Ashpan Annie, 94, Canadian survivor of the Halifax Explosion.
Mary Brancker, 95, British veterinary surgeon.
Barry Bresnihan, 66, Irish rugby union player and rheumatologist.
Jorge Cepernic, 95, Argentine politician, governor of Santa Cruz Province (1973–1976), after long illness.
Richard Hare, 87, British Anglican prelate, Bishop of Pontefract (1971–1992).
John Methuen, 62, British Anglican priest, Dean of Ripon (1995–2005).

19
Joseph Aghoghovbia, 69, Nigerian Olympic footballer.
Cécile Aubry, 81, French film actress, author, screenwriter and director, lung cancer.
Rory Brady, 52, Irish public servant, Attorney General (2002–2007).
Jon Cleary, 92, Australian novelist (The Sundowners, High Road to China), creator of Scobie Malone.
Daiki Sato, 21, Japanese footballer.
Mac Foster, 68, American boxer, MRSA infection.
Sokratis Giolias, 37, Greek reporter, shot.
Gerson Goldhaber, 86, American physicist, natural causes.
Andy Hummel, 59, American musician (Big Star), cancer.
Antoinette Meyer, 90, Swiss Olympic silver medal-winning (1948) alpine skier.
Jim Neu, 66, American playwright, lung cancer.
Stephen Schneider, 65, American climate scientist, heart attack.
Kottakkal Sivaraman, 74, Indian Kathakali actor.
David Warren, 85, Australian inventor of the flight data recorder.
Lorenzen Wright, 34, American basketball player (Memphis Grizzlies), shot.

20
Tyras S. Athey, 83, American politician, Maryland House of Delegates (1967–1993), Secretary of State (1993–1995).
Milon K. Banerji, 82, Indian jurist, Attorney General (1992–1996, 2004–2009), after long illness.
Raúl Arsenio Casado, 81, Argentine Roman Catholic prelate, Archbishop of Tucumán (1994–1999).
John Chaston, 93, British army officer.
Carlos Dávila Dávila, 96, American judge, Associate Justice of the Supreme Court of Puerto Rico (1961–1984).
Sir Randal Elliott, 87, New Zealand surgeon and campaigner for safety glass, after short illness.
Trausti Eyjólfsson, 82, Icelandic Olympic sprinter.
Emil Gabrielian, 79, Armenian physician.
Sandra Gardebring Ogren, 63, American judge, justice of the Minnesota Supreme Court, cancer.
Carl Gordon, 78, American actor (Roc), non-Hodgkin lymphoma.
Iris Gower, 75, Welsh novelist, after short illness.
Benedikt Sigurðsson Gröndal, 86, Icelandic politician, Prime Minister (1979–1980).
Amit Jethwa, 33, Indian environmental activist, shot.
Jimmy McMath, 60, American baseball player.
Lin Tsung-yi, 89, Taiwanese psychiatrist.
Sir Robin McLaren, 75, British diplomat, cancer.
Thomas Molnar, 89, American Roman Catholic philosopher, historian and political theorist.
Yūzo Nakamura, 68, Japanese Olympic gold (1972) and bronze (1964) medal-winning volleyball player.
Robert Sandall, 58, British radio presenter and music journalist, cancer.
Peter Walls, 83, British-born Rhodesian military commander.

21
Bae Ki-Suk, 23, South Korean boxer, brain injury sustained during a match.
Luis Corvalán, 93, Chilean politician, General Secretary of the Communist Party of Chile (1958–1989), natural causes.
Edna Healey, 92, British writer, wife of Denis Healey, heart failure.
Ralph Houk, 90, American baseball player (New York Yankees) and manager (New York Yankees, Detroit Tigers, Boston Red Sox), natural causes.
John E. Irving, 78, Canadian businessman, after short illness.
Randy Jackson, 61, American football player (Buffalo Bills, Philadelphia Eagles), pancreatic cancer.
Mabel Lang, 92, American archaeologist.
Doug Oldham, 79, American gospel music singer, complications from a fall.
*Anthony Rolfe Johnson, 69, English tenor, Alzheimer's disease.
Wesley C. Skiles, 52, American underwater photographer and filmmaker, drowning.
Domingos Gabriel Wisniewski, 82, Brazilian Roman Catholic prelate, Bishop of Apucarana (1983–2005).

22
Magnolia Antonino, 94, Filipino politician, Senator (1969–1972).
Vittorio Amandola, 57, Italian actor and voice actor, cancer.
Robert Freeman Asleson, 74, American publisher, prostate cancer.
Harry Beckett, 75, Barbadian-born British trumpeter and flugelhorn player, stroke.
Alvin Boretz, 91, American television writer (Armstrong Circle Theatre, N.Y.P.D.).
Dick Buckley, 85, American jazz historian and DJ, pneumonia.
Herbert Giersch, 89, German economist.
Kenny Guinn, 73, American politician, Governor of Nevada (1999–2007), fall.
Peter Hart, 46, Canadian historian, brain hemorrhage.
Bernard Knox, 95, British-born American classicist, heart failure.
Milan Paumer, 79, Czech anti-communist fighter (1948–1953), heart failure.
Rebel Randall, 88, American actress.
Florencio Vargas, 78, Filipino politician, Representative for 2nd District of Cagayan (2004–2010), leukemia.
Phillip Walker, 73, American blues musician, heart failure.

23
Satish Bahadur, 84, Indian film critic.
Willy Bakken, 59, Norwegian musician and writer, cancer.
Willem Breuker, 65, Dutch jazz musician, lung cancer.
Kenyon Cotton, 36, American football player (Baltimore Ravens, 1997–1998), complications following surgery.
Louis Danto, 81, Polish-born Canadian singer.
Freddie Dunkelman, 90, British Olympic ice hockey player.
Sol Encel, 85, Polish-born Australian sociologist.
Jan Halldoff, 70, Swedish film director.
A. Sreedhara Menon, 84, Indian historian.
Feodosiy Petsyna, 60, Ukrainian Orthodox prelate, archbishop of Drohobych and Sambir in Ukrainian Orthodox Church of the Kyivan Patriarchate (1994–2006) and Ukrainian Autocephalous Orthodox Church (since 2007), diabetes mellitus.
Daniel Schorr, 93, American journalist (CBS News, National Public Radio).
Dorothy Stowe, 89, American-born Canadian activist, co-founder of Greenpeace.
Bertrand Vac, 95, Canadian writer and surgeon.
Vic Ziegel, 72, American sports writer (Daily News), lung cancer.

24
David Ablett, 69, Canadian journalist and editor.
Theo Albrecht, 88, German entrepreneur and billionaire (Aldi Nord, Trader Joe's).
Giuseppe Aveni, 91, Italian priest and missionary, malignant tumor.
John Callahan, 59, American cartoonist and musician.
Alex Higgins, 61, Northern Irish snooker player, malnutrition, pneumonia, bronchial condition and throat cancer.
Hugh Mason, 95, British Olympic rower.
Mia Oremović, 91, Croatian actress, natural causes.
Jean-Louis Pezant, 71, French member of the Constitutional Council of France (since 2004).
Sir John Riddell, 13th Baronet, 76, British public servant, Private Secretary to the Prince of Wales (1985–1990).
Haakon Sandvold, 89, Norwegian industrialist.
Véronique Silver, 77, French actress.
Igor Talankin, 82, Russian film director and screenwriter, People's Artist of the USSR.

25
David Alexander, 77, American academic, cancer.
Vasco de Almeida e Costa, 77, Portuguese politician, Prime Minister (1976) and Governor of Macau (1981–1986), after long illness.
Domenico Alvaro, 85, Italian criminal, natural causes.
Kamel Asaad, 78, Lebanese politician, after long illness.
Donald C. Backer, 66, American astrophysicist and radio astronomer.
Barrie Devenport, 75, New Zealand swimmer, cancer.
Judith Peabody, 80, American socialite and philanthropist, complications of strokes.
Nathan Quinones, 79, American educator, New York City School Chancellor (1984–1987), stroke.
Erich Steidtmann, 95, German Nazi SS officer.
Henk Vonhoff, 79, Dutch politician, Queen's Commissioner of Groningen (1980–1996), after short illness.
Redford White, 54, Filipino actor and comedian, brain tumor.

26
John Barbero, 65, American public address announcer (Pittsburgh Penguins, 1972–2008), brain tumor.
Sir Brian Bell, 82, Papua New Guinean businessman and philanthropist.
Al Goodman, 67, American soul singer (Ray, Goodman & Brown), heart failure.
Eric Hill, 87, English cricketer.
Jake Jacobs, 73, American baseball player.
Ben Keith, 73, American rock musician and record producer, heart attack.
Charles Allen Moye Jr., 92, American senior (former chief) judge, of the District Court for the Northern District of Georgia.
Brigitte Schwaiger, 61, Austrian writer.
Sivakant Tiwari, 64, Singaporean lawyer (Singapore Legal Service), cerebral hemorrhage.

27
Andraos Abouna, 67, Iraqi Chaldean Catholic prelate, auxiliary bishop of Baghdad (2002–2010), renal failure.
Ravi Baswani, 63, Indian actor and comedian, heart attack.
Maury Chaykin, 61, American-born Canadian actor (Dances with Wolves, My Cousin Vinny, A Nero Wolfe Mystery), kidney failure.
Jon Douglas, 73, American college athlete and realtor.
Harry Galbreath, 45, American football player (Miami Dolphins), heart condition.
Edward Gamblin, 62, Canadian First Nations singer-songwriter
André Geerts, 54, Belgian cartoonist, cancer. 
Alan Gilbert, 65, Australian academic administrator and historian, foundıng Vice Chancellor of the University of Manchester, illness.
Wallace Souza, 51, Brazilian television presenter, politician and criminal.
Jack Tatum, 61, American football player (Oakland Raiders), heart attack.
Elinor Z. Taylor, 89, American politician, member of the Pennsylvania House of Representatives (1977–2006).
Morrie Yohai, 90, American businessman, inventor of Cheez Doodles, natural causes.

28
Valentin Abecia, 84, Bolivian lawyer, historian, writer and diplomat.
Thomas Anderson, 71, Australian Olympic gold medal-winning (1972) sailor.
John Aylesworth, 80, Canadian-born American television writer and producer, co-creator of Hee Haw, complications of pneumonia.
Michael Batterberry, 78, American editor, founder of Food and Wine Magazine, cancer.
Ivy Bean, 104, British Internet celebrity, one of the oldest people on Facebook and Twitter, natural causes.
Abdul Mannan Bhuiyan, 67, Bangladeshi politician.
Maria Canals, 96, Spanish pianist.
Bob Fenimore, 84, American football player (Chicago Bears), cancer.
Arthur Gish, 70, American peace activist and author, tractor accident.
Todd Hardy, 53, Canadian politician, MLA for Whitehorse Centre (1996–2000, since 2002), leader of the Yukon NDP (2002–2009).
Kemal Idris, 87, Indonesian Army general and political dissident, pneumonia.
George P. Lee, 67, American Mormon leader and sex offender, first Native American to become a general authority of The Church of Jesus Christ of Latter-day Saints.
Sven Ljungberg, 96, Swedish visual artist.
J. J. Maura, 61, American television announcer and voiceover artist (WCAU, QVC), cancer.
István Móna, 69, Hungarian Olympic modern pentathlete, gold medalist (1968 Summer Olympics).
Sir Daniel Pettit, 95, British Olympic footballer and industrialist.
Derf Scratch, 58, American bassist (Fear).
Katarzyna Sobczyk, 65, Polish singer, breast cancer.
David William, 84, British-born Canadian actor and artistic director, head injury.

29
Giancarlo Astrua, 82, Italian road bicycle racer.
Michèle Causse, 74, French lesbian theorist, author and translator, physician-assisted suicide.
*Ignacio Coronel Villarreal, 56, Mexican drug lord (Sinaloa Cartel), shot.
Carl Dooler, 67, British rugby league player (Featherstone Rovers).
Martin Drew, 66, British jazz drummer, heart attack.
António Feio, 55, Portuguese actor and comedian, pancreatic cancer.
C. I. Gunesekera, 90, Sri Lankan cricketer.
Bob Kennedy, 89, American football player (New York Yanks).
Sabina Mugabe, 75, Zimbabwean politician, MP (1985–2008) and sister of Robert Mugabe, after long illness.
Joe Perrault, 85, American Olympic ski jumper.
Nicolae Popescu, 72, Romanian mathematician.
Peter R. Romero, 90, American art director (The Right Stuff, The Waltons).
Robert C. Tucker, 92, American political scientist.
Bernie West, 92, American screenwriter (All in the Family, Three's Company, The Jeffersons), complications from Alzheimer's disease.
Alex Wilson, 76, British footballer (Portsmouth F.C.).
Lorene Yarnell, 66, American mime artist (Shields and Yarnell), brain aneurysm.
*Zheng Ji, 110, Chinese nutritionist and biochemist, world's oldest professor.

30
Eugene Anderson, 82, American lawyer, pneumonia.
Robert M. Chanock, 86, American biologist.
Jindřich Chmela, 86, Czech Olympic fencer.
Cyro Del Nero, 78, Brazilian scenographer (Fantástico), coronary disease.
Otto Joachim, 99, German-born Canadian violist and composer of electronic music.
Stanley Milburn, 83, British footballer.
*Qian Weichang, 96, Chinese physicist and applied mathematician.
Keith Richman, 56, American physician and politician, California State Assemblyman (2000–2006), brain cancer.

31
Suso Cecchi d'Amico, 96, Italian screenwriter (Bicycle Thieves, Senso).
James Atkinson, 81, American Olympic silver medal-winning (1952) bobsledder.
Olle Boström, 84, Swedish Olympic archer.
Pedro Dellacha, 84, Argentine footballer.
Tony Fox, 82, British Olympic rower.
Sir John Gorst, 82, British politician, MP for Hendon North (1970–1997).
Bill Lane, 90, American publisher and diplomat, founder of Sunset magazine, Ambassador to Australia and Nauru, respiratory failure.
Lee Lockwood, 78, American photojournalist, diabetes.
Tom Mankiewicz, 68, American screenwriter (James Bond, Superman), cancer.
Mitch Miller, 99, American music executive and television host (Sing Along with Mitch), after short illness.
Mohammad Nouri, 80, Iranian singer, blood disorder.
Dan Resin, 79, American actor (Caddyshack, On Our Own), complications from Parkinson's disease.
George Richey, 74, American songwriter and record producer, chronic obstructive pulmonary disease.
John Shaw, 76, British rugby league player.
Clara Sherman, 96, American Navajo artist.
Donald Shiley, 89, American engineer, co-inventor of the Bjork–Shiley heart valve.
Roy Smith, 56, Australian politician, member of the New South Wales Legislative Council (2007–2010).
Iwan Tirta, 75, Indonesian batik fashion designer, complications from strokes.

References

2010-07
 07